This is a list of articles that are considered real analysis topics.

General topics

Limits

Limit of a sequence
Subsequential limit – the limit of some subsequence
Limit of a function (see List of limits for a list of limits of common functions)
One-sided limit – either of the two limits of functions of real variables x, as x approaches a point from above or below
Squeeze theorem – confirms the limit of a function via comparison with two other functions
Big O notation – used to describe the limiting behavior of a function when the argument tends towards a particular value or infinity, usually in terms of simpler functions

Sequences and series
(see also list of mathematical series)

Arithmetic progression – a sequence of numbers such that the difference between the consecutive terms is constant
Generalized arithmetic progression –  a sequence of numbers such that the difference between consecutive terms can be one of several possible constants
Geometric progression – a sequence of numbers such that each consecutive term is found by multiplying the previous one by a fixed non-zero number
Harmonic progression –  a sequence formed by taking the reciprocals of the terms of an arithmetic progression
Finite sequence – see sequenceInfinite sequence – see sequenceDivergent sequence – see limit of a sequence or divergent seriesConvergent sequence – see limit of a sequence or convergent seriesCauchy sequence – a sequence whose elements become arbitrarily close to each other as the sequence progresses
Convergent series – a series whose sequence of partial sums converges
Divergent series – a series whose sequence of partial sums diverges
Power series – a series of the form 
Taylor series – a series of the form 
Maclaurin series – see Taylor seriesBinomial series – the Maclaurin series of the function f given by f(x) = (1 + x) α
Telescoping series
Alternating series
Geometric series
Divergent geometric series
Harmonic series
Fourier series
Lambert series

Summation methods

Cesàro summation
Euler summation
Lambert summation
Borel summation
Summation by parts – transforms the summation of products of into other summations
Cesàro mean
Abel's summation formula

More advanced topics

Convolution
Cauchy product –is the discrete convolution of two sequences
Farey sequence – the sequence of completely reduced fractions between 0 and 1
Oscillation – is the behaviour of a sequence of real numbers or a real-valued function, which does not converge, but also does not diverge to +∞ or −∞; and is also a quantitative measure for that.
Indeterminate forms – algebraic expressions gained in the context of limits. The indeterminate forms include 00, 0/0, 1∞, ∞ − ∞, ∞/∞,  0 × ∞, and ∞0.

Convergence

Pointwise convergence, Uniform convergence
Absolute convergence, Conditional convergence
Normal convergence
Radius of convergence

Convergence tests

Integral test for convergence
Cauchy's convergence test
Ratio test
Direct comparison test
Limit comparison test
Root test
Alternating series test
Dirichlet's test
Stolz–Cesàro theorem – is a criterion for proving the convergence of a sequence

Functions

Function of a real variable
Real multivariable function
Continuous function
Nowhere continuous function
Weierstrass function
Smooth function
Analytic function
Quasi-analytic function
Non-analytic smooth function
Flat function
Bump function
Differentiable function
Integrable function
Square-integrable function, p-integrable function
Monotonic function
Bernstein's theorem on monotone functions – states that any real-valued function on the half-line [0, ∞) that is totally monotone is a mixture of exponential functions
Inverse function
Convex function, Concave function
Singular function
Harmonic function
Weakly harmonic function
Proper convex function
Rational function
Orthogonal function
Implicit and explicit functions
Implicit function theorem – allows relations to be converted to functions
Measurable function
Baire one star function
Symmetric function
Domain
Codomain
Image
Support
Differential of a function

Continuity

Uniform continuity
Modulus of continuity
Lipschitz continuity
Semi-continuity
Equicontinuous
Absolute continuity
Hölder condition – condition for Hölder continuity

Distributions

Dirac delta function
Heaviside step function
Hilbert transform
Green's function

Variation

Bounded variation
Total variation

Derivatives

Second derivative
Inflection point – found using second derivatives
Directional derivative, Total derivative, Partial derivative

Differentiation rules

Linearity of differentiation
Product rule
Quotient rule
Chain rule
Inverse function theorem – gives sufficient conditions for a function to be invertible in a neighborhood of a point in its domain, also gives a formula for the derivative of the inverse function

Differentiation in geometry and topologysee also List of differential geometry topicsDifferentiable manifold
Differentiable structure
Submersion – a differentiable map between differentiable manifolds whose differential is everywhere surjective

Integrals(see also Lists of integrals)Antiderivative
Fundamental theorem of calculus – a theorem of antiderivatives
Multiple integral
Iterated integral
Improper integral
Cauchy principal value – method for assigning values to certain improper integrals
Line integral
Anderson's theorem – says that the integral of an integrable, symmetric, unimodal, non-negative function over an  n-dimensional convex body (K) does not decrease if K is translated inwards towards the origin

Integration and measure theorysee also List of integration and measure theory topicsRiemann integral, Riemann sum
Riemann–Stieltjes integral
Darboux integral
Lebesgue integration

Fundamental theorems

Monotone convergence theorem – relates monotonicity with convergence
Intermediate value theorem – states that for each value between the least upper bound and greatest lower bound of the image of a continuous function there is at least one point in its domain that the function maps to that value
Rolle's theorem – essentially states that a differentiable function which attains equal values at two distinct points must have a point somewhere between them where the first derivative is zero
Mean value theorem – that given an arc of a differentiable curve, there is at least one point on that arc at which the derivative of the curve is equal to the "average" derivative of the arc
Taylor's theorem – gives an approximation of a  times differentiable function around a given point by a -th order Taylor-polynomial.
L'Hôpital's rule – uses derivatives to help evaluate limits involving indeterminate forms
Abel's theorem – relates the limit of a power series to the sum of its coefficients
Lagrange inversion theorem – gives the Taylor series of the inverse of an analytic function
Darboux's theorem – states that all functions that result from the differentiation of other functions have the intermediate value property: the image of an interval is also an interval
Heine–Borel theorem – sometimes used as the defining property of compactness
Bolzano–Weierstrass theorem – states that each bounded sequence in  has a convergent subsequence
Extreme value theorem - states that if a function  is continuous in the closed and bounded interval , then it must attain a maximum and a minimum

Foundational topics

Numbers

Real numbers

Construction of the real numbers
Natural number
Integer
Rational number
Irrational number
Completeness of the real numbers
Least-upper-bound property
Real line
Extended real number line
Dedekind cut

Specific numbers

0
1
0.999...
Infinity

Sets

Open set
Neighbourhood
Cantor set
Derived set (mathematics)
Completeness
Limit superior and limit inferior
Supremum
Infimum
Interval
Partition of an interval

Maps

Contraction mapping
Metric map
Fixed point – a point of a function that maps to itself

Applied mathematical tools

Infinite expressions

Continued fraction
Series
Infinite products

InequalitiesSee list of inequalities''

Triangle inequality
Bernoulli's inequality
Cauchy–Schwarz inequality
Hölder's inequality
Minkowski inequality
Jensen's inequality
Chebyshev's inequality
Inequality of arithmetic and geometric means

Means
Generalized mean
Pythagorean means
Arithmetic mean
Geometric mean
Harmonic mean
Geometric–harmonic mean
Arithmetic–geometric mean
Weighted mean
Quasi-arithmetic mean

Orthogonal polynomials

Classical orthogonal polynomials
Hermite polynomials
Laguerre polynomials
Jacobi polynomials
Gegenbauer polynomials
Legendre polynomials

Spaces

Euclidean space
Metric space
Banach fixed point theorem – guarantees the existence and uniqueness of fixed points of certain self-maps of metric spaces, provides method to find them
Complete metric space
Topological space
Function space
Sequence space
Compact space

Measures

Lebesgue measure
Outer measure
Hausdorff measure
Dominated convergence theorem – provides sufficient conditions under which two limit processes commute, namely Lebesgue integration and almost everywhere convergence of a sequence of functions.

Field of sets

Sigma-algebra

Historical figures

Michel Rolle (1652–1719)
Brook Taylor (1685–1731)
Leonhard Euler (1707–1783)
Joseph-Louis Lagrange (1736–1813)
Joseph Fourier (1768–1830)
Bernard Bolzano (1781–1848)
Augustin Cauchy (1789–1857)
Niels Henrik Abel (1802–1829)
Peter Gustav Lejeune Dirichlet (1805–1859)
Karl Weierstrass (1815–1897)
Eduard Heine (1821–1881)
Pafnuty Chebyshev (1821–1894)
Leopold Kronecker (1823–1891)
Bernhard Riemann (1826–1866)
Richard Dedekind (1831–1916)
Rudolf Lipschitz (1832–1903)
Camille Jordan (1838–1922)
Jean Gaston Darboux (1842–1917)
Georg Cantor (1845–1918)
Ernesto Cesàro (1859–1906)
Otto Hölder (1859–1937)
Hermann Minkowski (1864–1909)
Alfred Tauber (1866–1942)
Felix Hausdorff (1868–1942)
Émile Borel (1871–1956)
Henri Lebesgue (1875–1941)
Wacław Sierpiński (1882–1969)
Johann Radon (1887–1956)
Karl Menger (1902–1985)

Related fields of analysis

Asymptotic analysis – studies a method of describing limiting behaviour
Convex analysis – studies the properties of convex functions and convex sets
List of convexity topics
Harmonic analysis – studies the representation of functions or signals as superpositions of basic waves
List of harmonic analysis topics
Fourier analysis – studies Fourier series and Fourier transforms
List of Fourier analysis topics
List of Fourier-related transforms
Complex analysis – studies the extension of real analysis to include complex numbers
Functional analysis – studies vector spaces endowed with limit-related structures and the linear operators acting upon these spaces
Nonstandard analysis –  studies mathematical analysis using a rigorous treatment of infinitesimals.

See also
 Calculus, the classical calculus of Newton and Leibniz.
 Non-standard calculus, a rigorous application of infinitesimals, in the sense of non-standard analysis, to the classical calculus of Newton and Leibniz.

 
Outlines of mathematics and logic
Wikipedia outlines
Mathematics-related lists